Lawrence Taliaferro Dade of "Bell Forest," (1785 in Orange County, Virginia – March 25, 1842 in Owensboro, Kentucky) was a Virginia state senator, planter and captain in the US Army. 

At the time he was serving as a member of the Virginia Assembly (1808–1819). He also served as a member of the Virginia State Senate from 1819 to 1832.

Before his death in 1842, he moved with his family to Owensboro, Kentucky.

Early and family life 
Lawrence Taliaferro Dade was born to Captain Francis Dade and Sarah Taliaferro in 1785. Captain Francis Dade and his cousin Baldwin Dade were patriots of the Revolutionary War serving in the 3rd Continental Light Dragoons.

He married Anne Mayo on May 4, 1815, in Henrico, Virginia.

Military
Dade entered the War of 1812 as Captain of the 2nd Regiment of the Virginia Artillery.

Career
After admission to the Virginia bar, Dade had a law office in Orange County, Virginia. When his cousin Francis L. Dade finished school, he read law under Lawrence's supervision.

Family 
Lawrence Taliaferro Dade's great-great-grandfather was Francis Dade (Virginia Burgess), also known as John Smith.

Virginia Senate
Virginia voters first elected Dade to the Virginia Senate in 1811, and he was re-elected numerous times. Much of his correspondence with President James Madison has survived.

During a senate session in 1828, Dade praised Joseph Cabell of Nelson County Virginia who was nearly regarded as a co-founder of the University of Virginia, stating "If aught of good proceeds from the University, the pride and glory of Virginia, the member from Nelson cannot be forgotten; for he, in promoting that monument of wisdom and taste, was second only to the immortal Jefferson."

Notes

References

External links 
 http://www2.lib.virginia.edu/small/collections/cabell/uva/founding.html

Virginia state senators
1785 births
1842 deaths
American militiamen in the War of 1812
People from Orange County, Virginia
Taliaferro family of Virginia